Bruno Felipe may refer to:

 Bruno Felipe (archer) (born 1964), French archer
 Bruno Felipe (footballer) (born 1994), Brazilian footballer